The 1942 Clemson Tigers football team was an American football that represented Clemson College as a member of the Southern Conference during the 1942 college football season. In their third season under head coach Frank Howard, the Tigers compiled a 3–6–1 record (2–3–1 against conference opponents), finished ninth in the conference, and were outscored by a total of 138 to 100. Memorial Stadium was inaugurated September 19 with a win against .  Clemson's 200th win came on Big Thursday against South Carolina.

Charlie Wright was the team captain. The team's statistical leaders included tailback Marion Butler with 504 passing yards, 616 rushing yards and 36 points scored (6 touchdowns).

End Chip Clark was selected as a first-team player on the 1942 All-Southern Conference football team.

Schedule

References

Clemson
Clemson Tigers football seasons
Clemson Tigers football